Two-time defending champions Todd Woodbridge and Mark Woodforde defeated Rick Leach and Scott Melville in the final, 7–5, 7–6(10–8), 7–6(7–5) to win the gentlemen's doubles title at the 1995 Wimbledon Championships. It was their third Wimbledon title and fourth major title overall.

Seeds

  Jacco Eltingh /  Paul Haarhuis (quarterfinals)
  Todd Woodbridge /  Mark Woodforde (champions)
  Grant Connell /  Patrick Galbraith (first round)
  Byron Black /  Jonathan Stark (third round)
  Jim Grabb /  Patrick McEnroe (first round)
  Jared Palmer /  Richey Reneberg (third round)
  Jan Apell /  Jonas Björkman (third round)
  Cyril Suk /  Daniel Vacek (first round)
  Tommy Ho /  Brett Steven (second round)
  Trevor Kronemann /  David Macpherson (second round)
  Mark Knowles /  Daniel Nestor (semifinals)
  Andrei Olhovskiy /  Jan Siemerink (quarterfinals)
  Alex O'Brien /  Sandon Stolle (third round)
  Marc-Kevin Goellner /  Yevgeny Kafelnikov (semifinals)
  Lan Bale /  John-Laffnie de Jager (third round)
  Piet Norval /  Menno Oosting (third round)

Qualifying

Draw

Finals

Top half

Section 1

Section 2

Bottom half

Section 3

Section 4

References

External links

1995 Wimbledon Championships – Men's draws and results at the International Tennis Federation

Men's Doubles
Wimbledon Championship by year – Men's doubles